Pixel Twist is a puzzle video game created by BOBBLEBROOK and published by Noodlecake Studios for the Android. In the game, players rotate a field of different colored blocks until the blocks are aligned such that they form a picture. The game is similar to the Flash game Coign of Vantage.

Reception
Android Magazine rated the game 4/5: "It isn't a long game by any stretch of the mind, but Pixel Twist is defi nitely a fun time-waster you should take a look at next time you hit the store."

References

External links
 Noodlecake.com, the publisher's website

Puzzle video games
Android (operating system) games
Noodlecake Games games